Thallis Theodoridis (Greek: Θαλλής Θεοδωρίδης, died 1850) was a Greek revolutionary leader during the Greek War of Independence.

He was born in Pyrgos and is the descendant of the rich Theodoridis family which descended from Divri (now Lampeia).  He was the secretary and aide of the Sissinaians and fought with his own army in Attica, Ilia, and the battle of Riolos.  After the revolution, he was the stockkeeper of Pyrgos, but was accused several times for embezzlement.  He died in 1850.

His grandson was Vasileios Theodoridis.

References
The first version of the article is translated and is based on the article at the Greek Wikipedia (el:Main Page)
Vyronas Davos, Ston Pyrgo kai stin Ilia tou 1821-1930 (Στον Πύργο και στην Ηλεία του 1821-1930 = In Athens and in Pyrgos From 1821 Until 1930), Athens 1996
Kostas Triantafyllou, Istoriko lexiko ton Patron (Ιστορικό λεξικό των Πατρών = Patras Historic Lexicon) Patras 1995
Domi Encyclopedia

1790s births
1850 deaths
Greek military leaders of the Greek War of Independence
People from Pyrgos, Elis